Luka Lipošinović (Serbian Cyrillic: Лука Липошиновић; 12 May 1933 – 26 September 1992) was a Yugoslavian (ethnic Croat from Vojvodina) football player. He earned 13 caps for Yugoslavia.

Club career
With the Croatian club Dinamo from Zagreb Lipošinović took two Yugoslav championships (1953–54 and 1957–58) and one Yugoslav cup (1960).

In 1965 Lipošinović joined the Austrian champion club LASK from Linz. He played one season, ending on 7th position. Several years later, he coached LASK Linz.

International career
As national team player, Lipošinović participated in the 1956 Olympics, winning silver medal, and the 1958 FIFA World Cup. He made his debut for Yugoslavia in a September 1954 friendly match away against Saarland and earned a total of 13 caps, scoring 3 goals. His final international was a May 1960 friendly away against England.

References

External links
 
 Profile at Serbian federation official site
 Povijest NK Dinamo History of NK Dinamo Zagreb. Rosters of Dinamo with Lipošinović included.
NK Dinamo 1954. A Photo. Lipošinović is the second in the sitting row.
Luka Lipošinović's profile at Sports Reference.com

1933 births
1992 deaths
Sportspeople from Subotica
Croats of Vojvodina
Association football forwards
Yugoslav footballers
Yugoslavia international footballers
Olympic footballers of Yugoslavia
Olympic medalists in football
Olympic silver medalists for Yugoslavia
Footballers at the 1956 Summer Olympics
Medalists at the 1956 Summer Olympics
1958 FIFA World Cup players
GNK Dinamo Zagreb players
LASK players
Yugoslav First League players
Yugoslav expatriate footballers
Expatriate footballers in Austria
Yugoslav expatriate sportspeople in Austria
Yugoslav football managers
LASK managers
Yugoslav expatriate football managers
Expatriate football managers in Austria